Minotaur or Mini is a fictional character, a superhero that appears in the  NEW-GEN comic books published by Marvel Comics. Created by Chris Matonti, J.D. Matonti, and Julia Coppola, he first appeared in NEW-GEN #1 (2010). He is the oldest founding member of the A.P.N.G. and their field leader. He gained his powers when Deadalus released a nanobot swarm on New-Gen.

Fictional Character Biography

Early life
Minotaur was a child on New-Gen when Deadalus, the apprentice of New-Gen's leader, Gabriel, released a massive quantity of biology manipulating nanobots on the world. Deadalus' nanobots drastically altered Mini's physical form to resemble an anthropomorphized bull, complete with double-jointed legs, horns, long ears and fur. Gabriel took Mini in as a means to ensure his safety and develop his powers for use in combating evil.

Battle in Ancient Crete
When Deadalus first discovered that his MetalMites could be used to dig out of the underworld into different planes of existence, he emerged during ancient times on the Mediterranean island of Crete and began wreaking havoc on the populace. Mini, as the oldest and best trained member of the A.P.N.G., was sent to dispatch Deadalus and save the innocent citizens. He fought Deadalus to a standstill until he was overwhelmed by continuing waves of MetalMite aggression. Eventually, he received help from Horus, a combat robot sent to his aid by Gabriel, and the ancient hero Perseus. After teaming up with them, Mini was finally able to defeat Deadalus, asking if he could kill him and end his vicious attacks on people. However, Gabriel denied him, saying that Deadalus could learn from his ways, then banished Deadalus to the underworld. After Mini departed, his story went down in history, and eventually became the ancient myth of the Minotaur of the Labyrinth.

Training with A.P.N.G.
Being the eldest member of the A.P.N.G, Mini received the added responsibility of acting as the group's drill sergeant and field leader. In addition to his academic studies, taught by Gabriel and his wife Thea, Mini led the team through a number of complex combat and tactics training sessions in order to hone their skills. As such, Mini became very close with his teammates, fostering a fierce loyalty to each member as he taught them.

Battle with Sly
Eventually, Deadalus, now known as Sly, managed to dig his way through the crust of the underworld into the futuristic city of Zadaar III with his large force of MetalMites and microbots. Mini was, again, the first responder sent to destroy as many of the MetalMites as possible. He started off well, destroying several MetalMites with his bare hands but eventually became overwhelmed, and was surrounded. Gabriel then dispatched the rest of the A.P.N.G. (Flyer, Roboduck, Diamond, and Gazelle) to assist their teammate. Mini continued to destroy several of the MetalMites by himself, and even used Roboduck as a hand cannon of sorts, shooting a series of fiery plasma burps through the monsters. As the tide of battle shifted away from his favor, Sly used his microbot-given powers to shoot the team with a nanobot killing laser, leaving them powerless. Gabriel teleported to the battlefield and gave each member of the A.P.N.G. a specialized nano-glove, containing nanobots which restore their powers and strength. As Gabriel fought Sly one-on-one, Mini got his strength back and furiously destroyed several more MetalMites with his teammates, eventually winning the battle and returning home to New-Gen.

Powers, abilities, and equipment
Deadalus' nanobots turned Mini's body into an anthropomorphized version of a bull. He possesses sharp horns, double jointed legs, hooves, pointed ears, and fur. He also possesses incredible superhuman strength and durability, able to rip a MetalMite in half with nothing but his hands while sustaining minimal injuries. Using his strength in his legs, Mini is capable of leaping enormous distances. He also has been known to headbutt enemies to pieces using his horns. Mini is an accomplished brawler and excellent strategist. He also has been outfitted with a wrist mounted grappling hook similar to those used by Batman.

References

External links
 https://web.archive.org/web/20110707153446/http://apngenterprises.com/comic/characters-of-new-gen/

Fictional characters with superhuman durability or invulnerability
Classical mythology in Marvel Comics
Marvel Comics characters with superhuman strength